Etelka or Etelke is a Hungarian given name. It is the female equivalent of Etele, a variant of Attila.

It is sometimes translated into English as Adelaide.

People with the name
 Etelka Barsi-Pataky (1941–2018), Hungarian politician
 Etelka Freund (1879–1977), Hungarian pianist
 Etelka Gerster (1855–1920), Hungarian soprano
 Etelka Kenéz Heka (born 1936), Hungarian writer and singer
 Etelka Keserű (1925–2018), Hungarian economist and politician
 Etelka Kispál (born 1941), Hungarian Olympic sprinter
 Etelka A. Leadlay (born 1947), British botanist
 Etelka Szapáry (1798–1876), Hungarian noble

See also
 Coleophora etelka, a moth of family Coleophoridae

References

Hungarian feminine given names